Drip or DRIP may refer to:

 Mesomycetozoea, a class of eukaryotes also known as the DRIP clade
 Drip gas, natural gas condensate
 Drip irrigation, in agriculture and gardening
 Dripping liquid
 Drip email (campaign), the process of automatically sending planned, scheduled emails to contacts or prospects
 Drip, an old-fashioned mild pejorative for someone exceptionally eccentric or lacking in social skills
 Intravenous therapy, in health and medicine
 Murphy drip, in proctoclysis
 Lithospheric drip, in geology
 Post-nasal drip, excessive mucus produced by the sinuses
 DRiP, Dividend reinvestment plan, in finance
 DRIP, one of the MARID protocol proposals in computing
 DRIP, Differentiate Reminder Inform Persuade, in marketing
 DRIP, the Data Retention and Investigatory Powers Act 2014, a piece of UK legislation
 DRIP, Vitamin D Receptor Interacting Protein
 Declaration on the Rights of Indigenous Peoples

Entertainment
 "Drip" (song), a song by Cardi B featuring Migos from the album Invasion of Privacy
 "Drip", a song by Brooke Candy featuring Erika Jayne from the album Sexorcism
 "Drips", a song by Eminem and Obie Trice from the album The Eminem Show
 The Drips, an American punk band
 "Drip" a television ident for BBC Two used in the 2001–2007 ident series (BBC Two 'Personality' idents)
 Drip painting, an art style of dripping paint across a canvas
 "Drip" (Hinapia song), the debut single by South Korean girl group Hinapia

See also
 Drop (disambiguation)
 Leak
 
 Drip brew, a coffee brewing method
 Drip-O-lator, a drip brew coffee pot
 Drip line (disambiguation)
 Drip pan, in an oven
 Dripetrua
 Dripping Springs (disambiguation)
 Dripsey, Ireland
 Dripstick
 Dripstone (disambiguation)
 Driptorch, a tool used in firefighting and forestry